Roland Burn (born 14 January 1950) is a Swiss biathlete. He competed in the 20 km individual event at the 1980 Winter Olympics.

References

1950 births
Living people
Swiss male biathletes
Olympic biathletes of Switzerland
Biathletes at the 1980 Winter Olympics
Place of birth missing (living people)